The Odisha semi-evergreen forests (also Orissa semi-evergreen forests)  are a tropical moist broadleaf forest ecoregion of eastern India.

Several of Odisha's largest cities, including Bhubaneswar, Cuttack, Puri, Chhatrapur, Kendrapara, and Bhadrak, lie within this ecoregion, and it has been extensively cleared for agriculture and urbanization. According to the WWF, 96% of the ecoregion's area has been cleared, and only 4% remains in the original semi-evergreen rain forest. Much of the remaining forest has been degraded by grazing and fuelwood harvesting.

Flora

Fauna 

This ecoregion does not harbour any endemic species, but despite the heavy anthropogenic changes of the landscape and the almost total deforestation, several large mammals are still living here, including elephant and tiger. Important mammals in need of special attention here, includes the tiger, Asian elephant, gaur, dhole (cuon alpinus), sloth bear, and chousingha (tetracerus quadricornis).

The birdlife in the Odisha semi-evergreen ecoregion is quite diverse with 215 known species. The lesser florican (Eupodotis indica) is globally threatened and has found a sanctuary here.

Protected areas

Of the total ecoregion area, about 12.8% is protected.

 Balukhand-Konark Wildlife Sanctuary (70 km2)
 Chilka Wildlife Sanctuary (980 km2), including the Nalbana Bird Sanctuary
 Nandankanan Wildlife Sanctuary (50 km2)

Only tiny fragments of semi-deciduous forest remains in Kapilash Forest Range, Chandaka Forest, Bolagarh Forest and Khallikote Forest.

Conservation 

The original biome of this ecoregion is almost non-existing. According to older surveys, this has been the case since at least 1968. If left to itself, the habitat is believed to be replaced by tropical evergreen forests, not semi-evergreen forests.

Forest management 
A study done by Reddy, Jha, & Dadhwal in this area is being used to shape environmental policies in India to protect biodiversity. Through monitoring long term forest resource changes show a loss in overall species and ecosystem services that can be measured in physical data. The results of this study show a connection between deforestation and habitat fragmentation, and loss of important biodiversity in the ecoregion.

See also
List of ecoregions in India

References

External links

 Geographical ecoregion maps and basic info.

 
Ecoregions of India
Forests of Odisha
Tropical and subtropical moist broadleaf forests
Forests of India
Geography of Odisha
Indomalayan ecoregions